The men's high jump at the 2017 Asian Athletics Championships was held on 6 and 8 July.

Medalists

Results

Qualification

Final

References

High
High jump at the Asian Athletics Championships